The 2007 Richmondshire District Council election took place on 3 May 2007 to elect members of Richmondshire District Council in North Yorkshire, England. The whole council was up for election and the council stayed under no overall control.

Election result

Ward results

By-elections between 2007 and 2011

Newsham with Eppleby
A by-election took place in Newsham with Eppleby on 7 August 2008 after the resignation of Conservative councillor Hamish Newhouse. The seat was held for the Conservatives by Mick Griffiths with a majority of 165 votes over Liberal Democrat Amanda Adams.

Hipswell
A by-election was held in Hipswell on 15 October 2009 after the resignation of Cnservative councillor Alicia Tye. The seat was held for the Conservatives by Stephanie Todd with a majority of 18 votes over Liberal Democrat Ann Bagley.

Middleham
A by-election was held in Middleham on 15 October 2009 after the resignation of Conservative councillor Roger Harrison-Topham. The seat was held for the Conservatives by Rachel Allen with a majority of 210 votes over Liberal Democrat Gina Ramsbottom.

References

2007
2007 English local elections
2000s in North Yorkshire